Neo Yee Pan (1938 – 5 March 2020) was a Malaysian politician, former Member of Parliament representing Muar (1974–1983) former Secretary General (1975–1979) and acting President of the MCA in Malaysia (1983–1984). He served as Housing and Local Government Minister, as well as a number of other Deputy roles in government. During his brief tenure as Acting MCA President, Pan and his associates used their power to expel several leading party members who had questioned the official party membership numbers, resulting in a leadership crises that ended when one of the expelled leaders, Tan Koon Swan, was formally elected as the new president of the party.

Political career
Neo  was elected as a member of the MCA Central Working Committee and appointed Deputy Secretary-General on 11 August 1973. Next year, in 1974, he successfully ran for parliament in Muar, and was immediately appointed as the Parliamentary Secretary to the Ministry of Energy, Technology and Research.

Acting Presidency and Membership Crisis 
On 25 March 1983, MCA President Lee San Choon announced his resignation and on May 1 formally left the office and Malay politics. Pan became the acting president. A crisis in the leadership stemmed from allegations of membership inflation within the party. Several party leaders moved for an investigation into the matter. On March 19, 1983, Pan and his deputy Mak Hon Kam dismissed several committee chairman and members, as well as party leaders at varying levels, including Vice President Tan Koon Swan. The expelled members were reinstated at an extraordinary general party meeting in May 1983. The following year, May 1984, Tan Koon Swan was elected to the MCA presidency, ending Pan's tenure.

Election results

Honours
  :
  Knight Commander of the Order of the Crown of Johor (DPMJ) – Dato' (1979)

References

1938 births
2020 deaths
21st-century Malaysian politicians
People from Muar
Presidents of Malaysian Chinese Association
Malaysian Chinese Association politicians
Knights Commander of the Order of the Crown of Johor